The Kokhav Hayarden Pumped Storage Power Station is a pumped-storage hydroelectric power station near Belvoir Castle in Beit She'an, Israel.

References

Power stations in Israel